Thunderstone is a US-based software company specializing in enterprise search. The company has its headquarters in Cleveland. Thunderstone began operations in 1981 and was one of the early pioneers in the enterprise search appliance market.

References

External links
 Official website
 Online demo
 Interview with General Manager in Arnold ITs search wizards

Software companies of the United States
1981 establishments in the United States
Software companies established in 1981
Companies established in 1981